Zaoqiang County is county in the southeast of Hebei province, China, served by G45 Daqing–Guangzhou Expressway.

Administrative divisions
The county administers 6 towns and 5 townships.

Towns:
Zaoqiang, Encha, Daying, Jiahui, Matun, Xiaozhang

Townships:
Zhangxiutun Township, Xintun Township, Wangjun Township, Tanglin Township, Wangchang Township

Climate

References

External links

County-level divisions of Hebei